Anneliese Schuh-Proxauf (10 March 1922 – 17 November 2020) was an Austrian alpine skier and tennis player. She competed in the 1948 Winter Olympics.

References

1922 births
2020 deaths
Austrian female alpine skiers
Olympic alpine skiers of Austria
Alpine skiers at the 1948 Winter Olympics
Austrian female tennis players
20th-century Austrian women
21st-century Austrian women